Maminigui is a town in central Ivory Coast. It is a sub-prefecture of Zuénoula Department in Marahoué Region, Sassandra-Marahoué District.

Maminigui was a commune until March 2012, when it became one of 1126 communes nationwide that were abolished.

In 2014, the population of the sub-prefecture of Maminigui was 25,047.

Villages
The 7 villages of the sub-prefecture of Maminigui and their population in 2014 are:
 Bibikorefla (859)
 Gouenfla (576)
 Gueriefla (2 747)
 Maminigui (5 319)
 Manfla (9 374)
 Soribouafla (947)
 Zambléfla (632)

Notes

Sub-prefectures of Marahoué
Former communes of Ivory Coast